The HP2 Enduro is a motorcycle manufactured by BMW Motorrad from 2005 to 2008. 
It is a "High Performance" (HP) dirt bike based on the engine and electronics from the R1200GS adventure-touring model. 
The use of a trellis tube frame, a conventional fork rather than Telelever, and other modifications, make it  lighter than the corresponding R1200GS.

The HP2 Enduro was discontinued in 2008.

Approximately 2910 HP2 Enduro's were produced in total.  2517 Euro Spec bikes and 393 US spec bikes

References

External links
http://www.realoem.com/bmw/select.do?vin=&part=&kind=M&arch=0

http://www.bmwarchiv.de/vin/bmw-vin-decoder.html

HP2 Enduro
Motorcycles powered by flat engines
Shaft drive motorcycles
Motorcycles introduced in 2005
Off-road motorcycles